|}

The Anniversary 4-Y-O Novices' Hurdle is a Grade 1 National Hunt hurdle race in Great Britain which is open to horses aged four years. It is run at Aintree over a distance of about 2 miles and 1 furlong (2 miles and 209 yards, or ), and during its running there are nine hurdles to be jumped. The race is for novice hurdlers, and it is scheduled to take place each year during the Grand National meeting in early April.

During the 1960s and early 1970s the race was called the Lancashire Hurdle, and it was subsequently known by several different sponsored titles. For a period it was classed at Grade 2 level, and it was promoted to Grade 1 status in 2005.

The Anniversary 4-Y-O Novices' Hurdle usually features horses which ran previously in the Triumph Hurdle, and the last to win both events was Pentland Hills in 2019.

Records
Leading jockey since 1977 (3 wins):
 Tony McCoy – Zabadi (1996), Hors La Loi III (1999), Binocular (2008)
 Robert Thornton – Katchit (2007), Walkon (2009), Grumeti (2012)

Leading trainer since 1977 (4 wins):
 Alan King – Katchit (2007), Walkon (2009), Grumeti (2012), L'Unique (2013)
 Paul Nicholls - Le Duc (2003), Zarkandar (2011), All Yours (2015), Monmiral (2021)

Winners since 1976

Earlier winners

 1960 – Clasping / Scarab 
 1961 – Anzio
 1962 – Imperator
 1963 – Running Rock
 1964 – Crown Prince
 1965 – Eurotas
 1966 – (Div 1) – The Spaniard 
 1966 – (Div 2) – Chancer
 1967 – Chaou II
 1968 – Golden Duck
 1969 – Clever Scot
 1970 – Tudor Dance
 1971 – True Luck
 1972 – Be My Guest
 1973 – Reclaim
 1974 – Perama
 1975 – Wovoka

See also
 Horse racing in Great Britain
 List of British National Hunt races

References

 Racing Post:
 Timeform
 2013

 aintree.co.uk – 2010 John Smith's Grand National Media Guide.
 pedigreequery.com – Anniversary 4-Y-O Novices' Hurdle – Aintree.
 

National Hunt races in Great Britain
Aintree Racecourse
National Hunt hurdle races